Hayley Rogers (born 7 September 1992) is a female badminton player from England. She studied mathematics and neuroscience at Keele University.

Achievements

BWF International Challenge/Series
Women's Doubles

 BWF International Challenge tournament
 BWF International Series tournament
 BWF Future Series tournament

References

External links
 

1992 births
Living people
English female badminton players